"New Tomorrow" is a 2011 English language song by Danish pop/rock band A Friend in London. It represented Denmark in the Eurovision Song Contest 2011, held in Düsseldorf, Germany. On 26 February 2011, the song won the Danish preselection contest Dansk Melodi Grand Prix in 2011. It is the first single from their debut album, Unite.

Immediately after, the single was released in Denmark, making it straight to #3 in its first week of release (chart dated 4 March 2011).

The song was used as the Labour Party's anthem for the 2013 Malta elections.

Controversy
"New Tomorrow" was written and composed by Lise Cabble and Jakob Glæsner. However, even before it was chosen to represent Denmark in the Eurovision Song Contest, it was accused of plagiarising parts of several different songs, e.g. "Herz an Herz" by German NDW band Paso Doble, "Sing for Me" by Swedish singer-songwriter Andreas Johnson, "Face 2 Face" by Future Trance United, "Super Star" by Taiwanese girl band S.H.E, "Silk Road" a Chinese folk tune interpreted by Kitaro, "Yasashii Uta" by MUCC, and "Shine" by Take That.

One of the co-writers Jacob Glæsner commented that "the song is very popular in its expression and consist basically only of five tones. It is unavoidable that it doesn’t remind of a song one has already heard".

Performance
A Friend in London performed the song during Eurovision 2011 finishing fifth overall with 134 points, including 12 points from Ireland, Iceland and the Netherlands and 10 points from Sweden and Estonia and 8 points from Slovenia.

Track listing
Digital download
"New Tomorrow" – 3:03
"New Tomorrow" (live from Smukfest 2012) – 6:33

Charts and certifications

Charts

Certifications

Release history

References

External links

A Friend in London songs
Eurovision songs of 2011
Eurovision songs of Denmark
Songs written by Lise Cabble
2011 songs
Songs involved in plagiarism controversies
Number-one singles in Iceland